Fidel Ernesto Suárez Becerra (born January 1, 1962, in Piura), known as Fidel Suárez, is a Peruvian retired footballer who played for clubs in Peru and Chile.

Titles
 Universitario 1985, 1987 and 1990 (Peruvian Primera División Championship)

Notes

External links
 
 

1962 births
Living people
People from Piura
Association football midfielders
Peruvian footballers
Peru international footballers
Sporting Cristal footballers
Atlético Torino footballers
Club Universitario de Deportes footballers
Deportes Iquique footballers
Sport Boys footballers
Cobresal footballers
C.D. Atlético Marte footballers
Alianza Atlético footballers
FBC Melgar footballers
Peruvian Primera División players
Chilean Primera División players
Peruvian expatriate footballers
Expatriate footballers in Chile
Expatriate footballers in El Salvador